The Hardest Love is the second studio album by Australian singer and songwriter Dean Lewis, released on 4 November 2022. It was initially announced on 2 September 2022 for release on 7 October 2022 before being delayed.

Lewis experimented with various producers on the album and upon release, explained the lengthy creation process: "I started writing the album in this hotel on Sunset in West Hollywood. I wrote in Nashville for a while, then I came back to LA and then went to London... there's a famous quote that says people have their whole life to write their first album, and then six months to write the next one. I feel like I've had double the amount of time for this album than the first one."

The album cover is a photo taken by Darren Craig, taken at night in Los Angeles.

Track listing

Charts

References

2022 albums
Dean Lewis albums
Island Records albums